Bear Claw Casino & Hotel is a small casino located on the White Bear First Nations near Moose Mountain Provincial Park and  Carlyle, Saskatchewan, Canada in the Moose Mountain Upland.  The  facility includes a casino (with 132 slot machines and 4 table games), lounge and restaurant, a 35-room hotel, and stalls for campers.

It was the first casino in Saskatchewan operated by a First Nations group to open in the province in 1993; at that time, it was caught up in a legal battle between the local First Nations group and the province over jurisdiction. The casino opened in 1993 in the club house of the White Bear Golf Course. It moved into its current location in 1996.

In 2010, the 35-room hotel was fully renovated when taken over by the Saskatchewan Indian Gaming Authority and joined to the casino facility. After reopening in June 2010, it became the first hotel operated by the Saskatchewan Indian Gaming Authority.

See also
List of casinos in Canada

References

External links 
Bear Claw Casino

Casinos in Saskatchewan
Music venues in Saskatchewan
Casino hotels
Casinos completed in 1993